Dominique Girard may refer to:

 Dominique Girard (diplomat), French ambassador to India
 Dominique Girard (garden designer) (1680–1738), landscape architect and engineer